Kirkville is a city in Wapello County, Iowa, United States. The population was 157 at the time of the 2020 census.

History
Kirkville was laid out in 1848 by John Kirkpatrick.

Geography
Kirkville is located at  (41.143995, -92.504520).

Demographics

2010 census
As of the census of 2010, there were 167 people, 68 households, and 46 families residing in the city. The racial makeup of the city was 97.6% White, 0.6% Native American, 1.2% from other races, and 0.6% from two or more races. Hispanic or Latino of any race were 1.8% of the population.

There were 68 households, of which 29.4% had children under the age of 18 living with them, 63.2% were married couples living together, 1.5% had a female householder with no husband present, 2.9% had a male householder with no wife present, and 32.4% were non-families. 23.5% of all households were made up of individuals, and 4.4% had someone living alone who was 65 years of age or older. The average household size was 2.46 and the average family size was 2.93.

The median age in the city was 43.5 years. 22.8% of residents were under the age of 18; 5.4% were between the ages of 18 and 24; 25.2% were from 25 to 44; 36% were from 45 to 64; and 10.8% were 65 years of age or older. The gender makeup of the city was 52.7% male and 47.3% female.

2000 census
As of the census of 2000, there were 214 people, 72 households, and 60 families residing in the city. The racial makeup of the city was 99.53% White and 0.47% Native American. Hispanic or Latino of any race were 0.47% of the population.

There were 72 households, out of which 41.7% had children under the age of 18 living with them, 76.4% were married couples living together, 2.8% had a female householder with no husband present, and 15.3% were non-families. 9.7% of all households were made up of individuals, and 5.6% had someone living alone who was 65 years of age or older. The average household size was 2.97 and the average family size was 3.11.

In the city, the population was spread out, with 31.3% under the age of 18, 7.0% from 18 to 24, 28.0% from 25 to 44, 24.8% from 45 to 64, and 8.9% who were 65 years of age or older. The median age was 34 years. For every 100 females, there were 107.8 males. For every 100 females age 18 and over, there were 107.0 males.

The median income for a household in the city was $31,354, and the median income for a family was $31,875. Males had a median income of $30,156 versus $17,500 for females. The per capita income for the city was $14,366. About 6.3% of families and 8.5% of the population were below the poverty line, including 16.0% of those under the age of eighteen and none of those 65 or over.

Education
Kirkville is within the Eddyville–Blakesburg–Fremont Community School District, formed by the 2012 merger of the Eddyville–Blakesburg Community School District and the Fremont Community School District. It previously resided in the Eddyville–Blakesburg district, which was formed in 1994 by the merger of the Eddyville Community School District and the Blakesburg Community School District.

References

Cities in Iowa
Cities in Wapello County, Iowa